The 2018 SANFL Women's League season was the second season of the SANFL Women's League (SANFLW). The season commenced on 2 February and concluded with the Grand Final on 25 April 2018.

Clubs

Ladder

Finals series

Preliminary final

Grand Final

References 

SANFL Women's League
SANFLW